Sir Valentine Browne (died 1589), of Croft, Lincolnshire, was auditor, treasurer and victualler of Berwick-upon-Tweed. He acquired large estates in Ireland during the Plantation of Munster, in particular the seignory of Molahiffe. He lived at Ross Castle near Killarney, County Kerry. He was MP in three English and one Irish parliaments.

Birth and origins 
Valentine was probably born in the late 1510s or early 1520s in Croft, Lincolnshire, eldest son of Sir Valentine Browne, knight, of Croft, who died in 1568. His father's family had been established in Totteridge, Hertfordshire, and in Hoxton, Middlesex (now in London), before moving to Lincolnshire. Nothing seems to be known about his mother.

Early life 
From 1550 to 1553 Browne was auditor at Berwick Castle. From 1553 to 1560 he was Auditor-General of Ireland.
He was appointed Surveyor General of Ireland in 1559 by Queen Elizabeth I of England, later being appointed Auditor of the Exchequer.

First marriage and children 
Valentine Browne married first Alice or Elizabeth, a daughter of Robert Alexander of London.

Valentine and Alice had a son:
 Valentine Browne (died 1606), High Sheriff of Lincolnshire, inherited the English lands. He married Elizabeth Monson, sister of Sir Thomas Monson, 1st Baronet, and had a son Valentine, who was MP for Lincolnshire.

A Valentine Brown of Lincolnshire was knighted by King James I at Belvoir Castle on 23 April 1603, but whether it was his eldest son or the homonym grandson is not sure.

Second marriage and children 
Valentine Browne married secondly Thomasine, daughter of Robert Bacon and sister of Nicholas Bacon, the Lord Keeper.

Valentine and Thomasine had two sons:
Nicholas (died 1606), knight of Molahiffe, received most of the Irish lands as appanage
Thomas (died 1640) who received the village of Hospital, County Limerick, as appanage

—and a daughter:
Elizabeth

Berwick 
Browne was appointed by Queen Elizabeth in the 1560s to several positions at Berwick-upon-Tweed, an important garrison of the English army on the Scottish border. As victualler and treasurer, he paid the troops and bought food for them.

Marian civil war 
He was also involved in financial aspects of the diplomacy and negotiations during the Scottish Reformation and the Marian civil war in which the English supported the King's party led by the Regent Moray who ruled Scotland for the young James VI of Scotland against the Queen's party, which supported Mary, Queen of Scots.

In 1568 Robert Melville discussed loans for the King's party secured on Mary's jewels. Regent Moray arranged credit with Browne for his diplomatic envoy John Wood in March 1569.

Rising of the North 

In 1569 the earls of Westmoreland, and Northumberland rose against Queen Elizabeth supporting the Catholic religion and the claim of Mary Stuart, Queen of Scots to the English throne. The rebels occupied Durham on 14 November 1569 where mass was celebrated in the cathedral. Lord Thomas Radclyffe, 3rd Earl of Sussex, who had been appointed Lord President of the North by Elizabeth in 1568, assembled an army in York and then marched against the rebels on 13 December. Browne had stayed loyal to Elizabeth and led some troops on this march as we know from a letter he wrote on 16 December 1569 to Henry Carey, 1st Baron Hunsdon, while approaching Durham. The rebels avoided engaging Sussex's superior forces and fled into Scotland. Lesser landlords implied in the rebellion were pardoned upon paying a fine that was collected by Thomas Gargrave, High Sheriff of Yorkshire, who handed the accounts and the money to Browne, treasurer, in July 1570. Browne was knighted by Sussex in 1570 becoming Sir Valentine of Totteridge (Hertfordshire), Croft (Lincolnshire), and Hoggsden (Middlesex).

Later life 
In 1571 Sir Valentine was elected MP for Berwick-upon-Tweed for the English Parliament of 1571. In 1572 he was elected MP for Thetford for the English Parliament of 1572.

The records of Cambridge University state that a Valentine Browne matriculated at Trinity College during the easter term of 1570. Although the source suggests that he was the person elected MP for Thetford in 1572, that matriculation date seems too late for the studies of the subject of this article.

Sir Valentine was Governor of Berwick in May 1573. during the "Lang Siege" of Edinburgh Castle during the Marian civil war (1568–1573). After the siege acquired some of the jewels of Mary, Queen of Scots that Sir William Drury brought from Scotland His page Gilbert Edward stole jewels from him including a diamond and ruby studded gold mermaid with a diamond shield or mirror, and a gold chain marked with Sir Valentine's initials "v. b." at the clasp. The costume of the runaway page was described, with yellow doublet, peach-coloured hose, blue stockings, and a grey hat. Sir Valentine's management of finance at Berwick was criticised several times.

When Francis Walsingham travelled to Scotland in August 1583, Sir Valentine wrote to him from Hoxton bemoaning the ruinous state of several castles of the north, including Bamborough, Dunstanburgh, Norham, and Etal.

Plantation of Munster 
In 1584 Sir Valentine became involved in the Plantation of Munster. The Irish province of Munster had been devastated since 1569 by the Desmond Rebellions which ended on 11 November 1583 when Gerald FitzGerald, 14th Earl of Desmond, the rebel earl, was killed. The earl's extensive lands were forfeit and the government planned to grant them to English undertakers and repopulate them with English settlers. In July 1584, the government commissioned a survey of these lands. Sir Valentine and Henry Wallop were appointed to manage this task. Arthur Robyns was one of the surveyors. In a letter to William Cecil, Lord Burleigh, Elizabeth's chief adviser, dated 10 October 1584, Sir Valentine wrote that "the work was so difficult as to have extended over three years." He further wrote from Askeaton that he had "travailed hard in superintending the survey, passing through bogs and woods, scaling mountains, and crossing many bridgeless rivers and dangerous waters", waters in which he lost some of his horses, and was twice nearly lost himself; that his son had broken his arm, and that "the service was so severe that many of the men had fallen sick". He described the towns and villages as ruined, and wrote that "not one of thirty persons" was left alive after the famine caused by crop destructions, and "those for the most part starvelings". Desmond's lands, thus nearly void of inhabitants, were, however, "replenished with wood, rivers, and fishings". Sir Valentine's survey divided the escheated lands into 35 seignories.

While living at Ross Castle near Killarney, Sir Valentine was in April 1585 elected MP for Sligo County in the Irish parliament of 1585/1586.

In 1586 He was elected MP of Berwick-upon-Tweed for the English Parliament of 1586, which submitted a petition demanding the execution of Mary Stuart, Queen of Scots.

In 1587 Sir Valentine returned to Ireland and applied for one of the seignories. He was granted Currans (in Kerry) in the early 1587 allotment, but this seignory was finally given to Charles Herbert and he was provisionally given the neighbouring seignory of Molahiffe instead. Molahiffe consisted of the territories of Onaght and Coshmaine, which had belonged to two vassals of Donald McCarthy, 1st Earl of Clancare who had sided with the rebels and died in the war. Clancare successfully claimed the lands for himself and then at a meeting with Sir Valentine in London on 28 June 1588 mortgaged them to him for about £600. Sir Valentine ended up owning  of land in County Kerry alone, in addition to earlier grants including the village of Hospital, County Limerick. He built a castle near this village, called Kenmare Castle. In 1688 when the Spanish Armada was menacing the coasts, he commanded a company for Ireland's defence.

Death, succession, and timeline 
Sir Valentine died on 8 February 1589 in Dublin and was buried in St Catherine's Church, Dublin (Church of Ireland), on 19 February 1589.

He was succeeded in England by his eldest son Valentine Browne of Croft and in Ireland by his second son Nicholas and his son Thomas. Nicholas was knighted and thus became Sir Nicholas. He married Sheila (or Julia), a daughter of Eoin the O'Sullivan Beare and probably converted to Catholicism to do so. O'Sullivan had lost his chieftainship to his nephew Donal Cam O'Sullivan Beare who had claimed a right to it by primogeniture.

Notes and references

Notes

Citations

Sources 

 
  – 1571 to 1574
 
 
 
 
 
  – 1611 to 1625
  – Memoirs
  – (for timeline)
  – 1580 to 1625
 
 
  – A to C
  – Report and appendix 
 
  – Barons (under Aylmer)
 
 
 
  – Knights bachelors & Index
  – Abbas to Cutts

Further reading 

1589 deaths
16th-century Anglo-Irish people
Alumni of Trinity College, Cambridge
Valentine
English knights
English MPs 1571
English MPs 1572–1583
English MPs 1586–1587
Irish MPs 1585–1586
Members of the Parliament of Ireland (pre-1801) for County Sligo constituencies
Members of the Privy Council of England
People from County Kerry
People from East Lindsey District
People of the Scottish Marian Civil War
Treasurers of Berwick
Year of birth uncertain
Year of birth unknown